The National Pest Plant Accord (NPPA) is a New Zealand agreement that identifies pest plants that are prohibited from sale and commercial propagation and distribution.

The Accord initially came into effect on 1 October 2001 between regional councils and government departments with biosecurity responsibilities, but in 2006 was revised to include the Nursery and Garden Industry Association as a member of the decision-making body. Under the Accord, regional councils undertake surveillance to ensure the pest plants are not being sold, propagated or distributed.

The Department of Conservation also lists 328 vascular plant species as environmental weeds – species that infest, are controlled on, or are damaging to land under its control.

List of species 

The National Pest Plant Accord is periodically updated, which was last done in 2012:

See also
Invasive species in New Zealand

References

External links
National Pest Plant Accord, Ministry for Primary Industries
ProtectNZ - website operated by the Ministry of Agriculture and Forestry

2001 in New Zealand
 
Lists of invasive species
Environmental issues in New Zealand
Agricultural pests
Weeds